The Women's pursuit event of the Biathlon World Championships 2016 was held on 6 March 2016. The fastest 60 athletes of the sprint competition participated over a course of 10 km.

Results
The race was started at 15:45 CET.

References

Women's pursuit
2016 in Norwegian women's sport